Connor Dewar (born June 26, 1999) is a Canadian professional ice hockey forward currently playing for the  Minnesota Wild of the National Hockey League (NHL).

Early life
Dewar was born on June 26, 1999, in The Pas, Manitoba, Canada to parents Kim and Jade. Dewar is of Red River Métis descent. Growing up, he skated on a backyard rink built by his father before moving to Dauphin, Manitoba with his mother to skate for the Dauphin-based Parkland Rangers bantam team. He remained in Dauphin until he was 15 years old while skating with the Rangers midget AAA team. As a result of his junior play, Dewar was drafted by the Everett Silvertips of the Western Hockey League (WHL) in the 2014 WHL Bantam Draft.

Playing career

Major junior
Dewar signed a Western Hockey League Standard Player Agreement on September 1, 2015, with the Silvertips. Dewar subsequently joined the Silvertips as a 16-year-old rookie for the 2015–16 season. He recorded his first WHL goal to clinch a 2–0 win over the Prince George Cougars during his debut game. He played in all 72 regular-season games and all nine playoff games during his rookie season, earning the "Iron Man Award" and "Rookie of the Year." He finished his rookie season with 11 goals and seven assists, becoming the first Silvertip rookie to reach double digits in goals since Manraj Hayer. Following his rookie season, Dewar returned to the Silvertips and set new career highs in goals, assists, and points through 71 games. At the conclusion of his sophomore season, Dewar was invited to participate in the Toronto Maple Leafs training camp.

Dewar returned to the Silvertips for his third season where he served as an alternate captain while setting new career highs in points, assists, and goals. As a result of his play, Dewar was ranked 80th overall amongst North American skaters by the NHL Central Scouting Bureau. He was eventually drafted 92nd overall by the Minnesota Wild at the 2018 NHL Entry Draft.

Prior to the 2018–19 season, Dewar was named the 16th captain in Everett Silvertips history. He was also invited to participate at the Minnesota Wild's training camp before being returned to the WHL. However, early in the season, Dewar was given a four-game suspension in response to cross-checking major penalty and game misconduct in Everett's 5–2 loss at Brandon. Upon returning to the Silvertips lineup, Dewar led the Silvertips with 73 points before suffering an upper body injury. He finished his fourth year campaign with 81 points, including 29 power play points and 309 shots on goal. His point total earned him seventh ranking in Silvertips single season history. As a result, Dewar was named to the WHL Western Conference First All-Star Team.

Professional
Dewar concluded his major junior career by signing a three-year, entry-level contract with the Wild on March 5, 2019. He subsequently joined the Wild's American Hockey League (AHL) affiliate, the Iowa Wild for the remainder of the season. Dewar recorded his first professional goal and assist in a 4–3 loss to the Chicago Wolves on November 17, 2019. He finished his rookie season with 19 points, six goals and 13 assists, through 52 games. Dewar switched his jersey number from 52 to 26 for the 2022-23 season.

Career statistics

Awards and honours

References

External links
 

1999 births
Living people
Canadian ice hockey left wingers
Canadian Métis people
Everett Silvertips players
Iowa Wild players
Ice hockey people from Manitoba
Métis sportspeople
Minnesota Wild draft picks
Minnesota Wild players